The 1868 Greenwich by-election was held on 21 December 1868.  The by-election was held due to the incumbent Liberal MP, William Ewart Gladstone, becoming the prime minister and First Lord of the Treasury.  It was retained by Gladstone, who was unopposed.

References

Greenwich by-election
Greenwich,1868
Greenwich by-election
Unopposed ministerial by-elections to the Parliament of the United Kingdom in English constituencies
19th century in Kent
Greenwich by-election
William Ewart Gladstone
Politics of the Royal Borough of Greenwich